1997 devolution referendum may refer to:

1997 Scottish devolution referendum
1997 Welsh devolution referendum